Kahrstedt is a village and a former municipality in the district Altmarkkreis Salzwedel, in Saxony-Anhalt, Germany. Since 1 January 2009, it is part of the town Kalbe.

Former municipalities in Saxony-Anhalt
Kalbe, Saxony-Anhalt